The discography of Scottish rock band The Twilight Sad consists of five studio albums, four compilation albums, fifteen singles, and five extended plays (EPs). The band currently consists of James Graham (vocals, lyrics), Andy MacFarlane (guitar, production), Johnny Docherty (bass), Brendan Smith (keyboards) and Sebastien Schultz (drums). The Kilsyth-based band formed in 2003 and were signed to Fat Cat Records when Alex Knight, co-founder of the label, went to Glasgow to watch the band perform their third gig and signed them on the spot. The band released their debut EP The Twilight Sad in November 2006 in the United States only, followed by their debut album Fourteen Autumns & Fifteen Winters in April 2007, which garnered widespread critical acclaim. The album spawned two singles, "That Summer, at Home I Had Become the Invisible Boy" in April, and "And She Would Darken the Memory" in July. The following year, the band released Here, It Never Snowed. Afterwards It Did, a mini-album of reworked versions of songs from Fourteen Autumns & Fifteen Winters and two non-album tracks, inspired by stripped-down live performances. A collection of live versions and previously unreleased tracks entitled Killed My Parents and Hit the Road was released in December 2008. The Twilight Sad's second studio album, Forget the Night Ahead, was released in September 2009 to further acclaim and marked a shift in the band's direction towards a darker and more streamlined sound. The album produced three singles: "I Became a Prostitute" in August 2009, "Seven Years of Letters" in October 2009, and "The Room" in April 2010. Founding bassist Craig Orzel left the band in February 2010, and the band released The Wrong Car EP in September of that year.

The Twilight Sad's third studio album, No One Can Ever Know, was released in February 2012 and marked another stylistic shift, with the band citing industrial music and krautrock influences for a darker, sparser sound. The album yielded two singles, "Sick" in November 2011 and "Another Bed" in February 2012 (both singles were released as limited edition 7" vinyl singles, with the non-album tracks "Untitled No. 67" and "A Million Ignorants", respectively); in addition to a collection of remixes entitled No One Can Ever Know: The Remixes, and a limited edition CD-R EP entitled N/O/C/E/K Tour EP, available only at select tour dates. In January 2014, the band released a free digital download and video of the band performing nine songs with the Royal Scottish National Orchestra, recorded live at Paisley Abbey in October 2013. The band's fourth studio album, Nobody Wants to Be Here and Nobody Wants to Leave, was released in October 2014 to positive reviews, preceded by the download-only single "Last January" in September. A limited edition EP, entitled Òran Mór Session, was self-released by the band in late October 2014 and made available only at the band's tour dates (the EP was later expanded with additional tracks and given a wider commercial release in October 2015). The album's second single, "I Could Give You All That You Don't Want", was released on 9 February 2015 as a picture disc 7" vinyl single, with the exclusive double A-side track "The Airport". The album's third single, "It Never Was the Same", was released on 29 June 2015. The single was released as a double A-side on white-coloured 7" vinyl, with the exclusive track "There's a Girl in the Corner" as covered by Robert Smith of The Cure. Nobody Wants to Be Here turned out to be the band's last studio album with founding drummer Mark Devine, who amicably left the band in January 2018.

The Twilight Sad announced on 10 July 2018 that they had signed to Mogwai's label Rock Action Records, and released their new single "I/m Not Here [missing face]" for download and streaming. On 5 September, the band announced that their fifth studio album, titled and stylised as It Won/t Be Like This All the Time, would be released on 18 January 2019. The first proper single, "Videograms", preceded the album on 26 October 2018. The album's third single, "VTr", was released as a digital download only on 13 November 2018. The album was released to universally positive reviews. Two extra songs recorded during the album sessions, "Rats" and "Public Housing", were released as a limited edition double A-side 7" single on 6 December 2019.

Studio albums

Live  albums

Compilation albums

EPs

Singles

Music videos

References

The Twilight Sad albums
Discographies of British artists
Rock music group discographies